Flavie Aumond (born 4 December 2002) is a Canadian freestyle skier who competes internationally in the aerials discipline.

Career
Aumond joined the national team in 2020. Aumond had a fifth-place finish at the Deer Valley stop of the World Cup, the last stop before the 2022 Winter Olympics.

On January 24, 2022, Aumond was named to Canada's 2022 Olympic team.

References

External links 
 

2002 births
Living people
Canadian female freestyle skiers
Sportspeople from Montreal
Freestyle skiers at the 2022 Winter Olympics
Olympic freestyle skiers of Canada